The St. Francis Roman Catholic Church (Lat: Diocesis Hpaanensis) is a diocese of the Latin Church of the Roman Catholic Church in Hpa-An, Kayin State. The diocese was erected on January 24, 2009 from the Roman Catholic Archdiocese of Yangon. The current bishop of the diocese is Justin Saw Min Thide.

References
 Catholic Hierarchy
 G Catholic

See also
Catholic Church in Burma

Pyay
Christian organizations established in 2009